Alexandre Ménard-Burrows (born April 11, 1981) is a Canadian former professional ice hockey left winger who played in the National Hockey League (NHL) with the Vancouver Canucks and the Ottawa Senators. He is currently an assistant coach for the Montreal Canadiens of the National Hockey League. He was known for playing in the style of an agitator before developing into a skilled, top line fixture. He is also regarded for his remarkable ascension to the NHL from being an undrafted player in the ECHL. After a two-year career in the Quebec Major Junior Hockey League (QMJHL), he played in the minor leagues for three seasons. He was signed by the Vancouver Canucks in 2005 from their American Hockey League (AHL) affiliate, the Manitoba Moose. Burrows established himself as a checking forward with the Canucks in his first three NHL seasons before emerging as a scorer with four consecutive 25-plus-goal seasons from 2008–09 to 2011–12.

Before making it to the NHL, Burrows also enjoyed a prolific ball hockey career, competing in national and international tournaments in the summers. In 2005, he was named the International Ball Hockey Player of the Year. He has also been inducted into the Canadian and International Ball Hockey Hall of Fame.

Playing career

Junior and minor leagues
As a youth, Burrows played in the 1995 Quebec International Pee-Wee Hockey Tournament with a minor ice hockey team from La Presqu'île, near Montreal.

Burrows played two seasons in the Quebec Major Junior Hockey League (QMJHL) with the Shawinigan Cataractes, beginning in 2000–01. He recorded 16 goals and 30 points over 63 regular season games, then added three points over 10 post-season games. The following season, he improved to 35 goals and 70 points over 64 games, third in team-scoring, behind Jonathan Bellemare and Jason Pominville. He went on to lead his team in post-season scoring with nine goals and 21 points in 12 games as the Cataractes advanced to the Conference Finals, where they were eliminated in seven games by the Victoriaville Tigres.

Undrafted by a National Hockey League (NHL) club, Burrows went professional in 2002–03 with the Greenville Grrrowl of the ECHL, a third-tier minor league. Late in his professional rookie season, he transferred to the Baton Rouge Kingfish and finished with a combined 32 points in 66 games between the two teams. The following season, in 2003–04, he returned to the South Division, as he was signed by the Columbia Inferno. Early in the season, he was signed by Columbia's American Hockey League (AHL) affiliate, the Manitoba Moose, on October 21, 2003, having been scouted by Moose general manager Craig Heisinger. He appeared in two AHL games for Manitoba before being sent back down to the ECHL. Shortly after his return, he was suspended for three games and fined an undisclosed amount by the league for abusing officials during a game on October 24 against the Greensboro Generals. Later on in the season, he was named to the 2004 ECHL All-Star Game for the Eastern Conference and recorded one assist. He went on to finish the season with 29 goals and 73 points, second in points among Columbia players to league-scoring champion Tim Smith.

In the subsequent off-season, Burrows was re-signed by the Moose on August 3, 2004. He was initially sent back down to the ECHL after a training camp both he and head coach Randy Carlyle described as disappointing. Following an injury to Wade Brookbank, he was recalled on October 29, 2004. He scored his first AHL goal with the Moose five days later, a game-winning goal against goaltender David LeNeveu of the Utah Grizzlies in a 2–1 win. He finished the 2004–05 season with Manitoba and posted 26 points over 72 games in a fourth-line role.

Vancouver Canucks (2006–2017)
Having worked his way up from the ECHL, Burrows' energetic play in the minors earned him a two-way contract with the Moose's NHL affiliate, the Vancouver Canucks, on November 8, 2005. He had appeared earlier in the Canucks' training camp for the 2005–06 season, but was sent back to the Moose. After recording 30 points in 33 games with the Moose, he was recalled by the Canucks on January 2, 2006. Eight days later, Burrows scored his first career NHL goal against Ed Belfour of the Toronto Maple Leafs. He also added an assist as the Canucks won the game 4–3. Establishing himself on the Canucks roster, he added his first NHL career hat-trick on March 27, 2006, in a 7–4 win against the Los Angeles Kings. He finished with seven goals and 12 points over 43 games in his NHL rookie campaign. Burrows' ascension to the NHL has been attributed to his hard-working and abrasive style of play, generating momentum for his team and aggravating opposing players.

Burrows completed his first full campaign with the Canucks the following season in 2006–07. He contributed primarily on the team's penalty kill, which ranked first in the league. Burrows' average shorthanded ice time per game was second among team forwards, behind Ryan Kesler. He struggled to produce offensively, however, and recorded a career-low three goals and nine points in 81 games.

In 2007–08, Burrows formed an effective duo with centre Ryan Kesler on the third line as defensive forwards, countering opposing teams' top players while contributing offensively, as well. During the season, he was fined an undisclosed amount by the league after spearing Detroit Red Wings forward Aaron Downey at centre ice during the two teams' pre-game skate on February 23, 2008. He finished the campaign with 12 goals, 31 points and a team-high plus-minus of +11. He was voted by Canucks' fans to receive the team's Most Exciting Player Award and the Fred J. Hume Award, given to the team's "unsung hero" as voted by the Canucks Booster Club.

After remaining on the third line with Kesler at the start of the following season, head coach Alain Vigneault separated the two after the All-Star break, placing Burrows on the first line with Daniel and Henrik Sedin, beginning on February 12, 2009, during a game against the Phoenix Coyotes. Burrows' crash-the-net style—skating hard to the opposing team's goalmouth for rebounds or tip-ins—combined well with the Sedins' cycling plays. Vigneault's line adjustments were precipitated by a losing streak in January, which Burrows was instrumental in breaking. The Canucks' home winless streak had extended to eight games, a franchise record, when Burrows broke a 3–3 tie with a shorthanded breakaway goal with 82 seconds remaining in a game against the Carolina Hurricanes. This sparked a resurgence in the Canucks, spearheaded by Burrows, who then immediately followed their record setting home losing streak with a record setting home winning streak, winning their next 10 games at home. Shortly thereafter, the Canucks extended his contract with a four-year, $8 million deal on February 4, 2009, quadrupling his $525,000 salary. Following a game against the Edmonton Oilers on April 4, Burrows received a $2,500 fine from the league for punching Oilers enforcer Zach Stortini from the bench.

Late in the campaign, he was selected by the Professional Hockey Writers' Association as the Canucks' nominee for the Bill Masterton Memorial Trophy, awarded for perseverance, dedication and sportsmanship. Burrows was not shortlisted for the award, however. Prior to the last game of the season, he received his second consecutive Most Exciting Player Award.

Playing in a more offensive role on the first line for the latter part of the season, Burrows finished the 2008–09 campaign with 51 points. His 28 goals broke Andrew Brunette's mark for the most in a single season by an ECHL alumnus (27 in 2006–07). In the subsequent first round of the 2009 playoffs, Burrows scored the series-winning goal in overtime to sweep the St. Louis Blues. It was his second goal of the game. The Canucks advanced to meet the Chicago Blackhawks in the second round, who defeated them in six games. Burrows' level of play was noticeably diminished in the Chicago series and it was revealed afterwards that he required surgery to remove bone chips in his left wrist. He finished the playoffs with three goals and an assist over 10 games.

The following season, Burrows recorded back-to-back hat tricks against the Columbus Blue Jackets and Phoenix Coyotes on January 5 and 7, 2010, respectively. It marked the first time an NHL player notched consecutive three-goal games since Ilya Kovalchuk in November 2007 and the first time a Canucks player did so since Petri Skriko in 1986. With six goals and an assist over two games, Burrows was named the NHL First Star of the Week on January 11, 2010.

NHL officials controversy
The night of his first star of the week selection, Burrows and the Canucks played a controversial game against the Nashville Predators. With the game tied 2–2 in the third period, Burrows was penalized twice by referee Stéphane Auger—once for diving and the other for interference. The latter call was deemed questionable by media sources, including TSN and the National Post. The interference penalty along with an additional penalty committed by Henrik Sedin resulted in Nashville's game-winning, 5-on-3 powerplay goal late in the game. With three seconds to go in regulation, Burrows skated by Auger and protested the interference penalty, resulting in an unsportsmanlike minor and a ten-minute misconduct.

Following the game, Burrows accused Auger of having a personal vendetta against him for a play against the Predators the previous month that had made him look bad. After Burrows had been hit into the boards by Nashville forward Jerred Smithson during a game on December 8, 2009, Auger assessed Smithson with a five-minute major and a game misconduct. However, the league later rescinded because it was believed Burrows had embellished injury. Burrows claimed that Auger told him before the January 11 game: "you made me look bad [for calling the Smithson penalty] so I'm going to get you back tonight." He went on to tell reporters that Auger "should stay out for the rest of the year making calls like that ... We just blew two points because of his officiating tonight."

The following day, the NHL fined Burrows US$2,500 for publicly criticizing Auger and deemed that his claims "cannot be substantiated." Later that week, the Canadian Broadcasting Corporation (CBC)'s Hockey Night in Canada telecast aired an 11-minute segment hosted by Ron MacLean and NHL vice-president Colin Campbell reviewing Burrows' past transgressions, spanning two years. The segment was widely criticized for being biased against Burrows and failing to illustrate both sides of the argument. Burrows' parents subsequently issued a formal letter of complaint to the CBC, accusing MacLean of "verbal assassination" and for displaying "no journalistic balance."

The following Saturday after the segment aired, the Canucks refused any interviews with the CBC before, during or after their game against the Chicago Blackhawks, which was broadcast on Hockey Night in Canada. The boycott was ordered by Canucks general manager Mike Gillis after MacLean refused to apologize. CBC and Canucks representatives later agreed in a conference call to "move on" and team players were allowed to resume interviews. MacLean later issued an unofficial apology aimed to clarify the situation.

Later in the 2009–10 season, Burrows left during a game against the Los Angeles Kings after being hit in the throat by a Jarret Stoll slapshot. He was not injured, however, and did not miss any games thereafter. Playing a full season on the Canucks' top line with the Sedins, he recorded a career-high 35 goals, 32 assists, 67 points and a +34 rating. His goals total ranked first on the Canucks. Fans voted him as recipient of the team's Most Exciting Player Award for the third consecutive season.

The Canucks first line struggled to score in the playoffs, however. In 12 games, Burrows scored three goals, two of which were into empty nets, and notched three assists. The Canucks advanced to the second round past the Los Angeles Kings, where they were eliminated by the Chicago Blackhawks for the second consecutive year. It was revealed in the off-season that Burrows was suffering from a shoulder injury, which he later received surgery for.

While Burrows' offensive numbers increased from playing on the top line, the Sedins' mutually benefitted from playing with him. Daniel and Henrik had not had a constant linemate on the first line since Anson Carter played with them in 2005–06. Since then, Vigneault had used a variety of wingers, including Markus Näslund, Taylor Pyatt and Steve Bernier, to fill in the unit. In those years, Daniel and Henrik were point-a-game players; with Burrows on their line, they vaulted into top scorers in the league, as Henrik won the Art Ross Trophy as the league's leading point-getter (Daniel scored at a similar pace, but played less due to an injury).

Run to the 2011 Stanley Cup Finals

Due to rehabilitation from the shoulder surgery, Burrows missed the first ten games of the 2010–11 season. Continuing to play with the Sedins upon his return, he recorded 48 points (26 goals and 22 assists) in 72 games, sixth in team-scoring. Winning the Presidents' Trophy, the Canucks entered the 2011 playoffs as the first seed in the West and matched up against the Blackhawks for the third consecutive year. With a 3–0 lead in the series, the Canucks lost their next three games, resulting in a game seven. In the deciding game, Burrows scored both Canucks goals, including the overtime winner after a turnover from defenseman Chris Campoli.

After defeating the Nashville Predators and San Jose Sharks in rounds two and three, the Canucks reached the Stanley Cup Finals for the first time in 17 years. Playing the Boston Bruins, Burrows received much attention of the series for biting opposing forward Patrice Bergeron during a scrum at the end of the first period in Game 1 of the series.  While the two players were being held apart by a linesman, Burrows appears to be shown biting down on Bergeron's finger, while both players were pushing and shoving at one another. The incident was reviewed by the league, but was ruled unsuspendable with "no conclusive evidence that [he] intentionally bit [Bergeron's] finger." The following game, Burrows scored his second overtime-winner of the playoffs, part of a three-point effort (two goals and an assist). Occurring 11 seconds into the extra period, it was the second-fastest goal scored from the start of an overtime game in Stanley Cup Finals history (Montreal Canadiens forward Brian Skrudland scored nine seconds into overtime in Game 2 of the 1986 Stanley Cup Finals against the Calgary Flames). With two overtime goals in one playoff season, Burrows tied the NHL record, which was held by 28 other players. After leading two-games-to-none in the series, Vancouver went on to lose the Stanley Cup to Boston in seven games. Burrows finished the postseason with 9 goals and 17 points over 25 games.

In 2011–12, Burrows recorded 28 goals and 52 points in 80 contests, helping Vancouver to a second consecutive Presidents' Trophy. Facing the eighth-seeded Los Angeles Kings in the first round, they were eliminated in five games. Burrows had one goal during the series. The Los Angeles Kings went on to become the 2012 Stanley Cup champions.

On March 16, 2013, Burrows scored a goal six seconds into a game against the Detroit Red Wings, setting a Canucks record for fastest goal scored to start a game. This surpassed the previous record of nine seconds set by Trevor Linden and was also the fourth-fastest goal scored to start a game in NHL history. Burrows managed 13 goals and 11 assists in the lock-out-shortened 2012–13 season.

Burrows had a forgettable 2013–14 season, scoring only 5 goals and 10 assists. In 49 games played, he did not score until game 36, where he scored two goals against the Winnipeg Jets. His 15 points on the year were the third-lowest of his career and his lowest since 2006–07. The 2013–14 season was also forgettable for the Canucks as a whole, as they failed to qualify for the playoffs for the first time since 2007–08.

The 2014–15 season saw the Canucks sign free agent Radim Vrbata, who replaced Burrows as the Sedins' primary linemate. Burrows played only a handful of games with the Sedins, mainly in the latter part of the season. Playing mainly on the second line, Burrows tallied 18 goals and 15 assists in 70 games.

Burrows finished the 2015–16 season with 9 goals and 13 assists in 79 games, splitting time on the third and fourth lines. Towards the end of the season, it was speculated the Canucks would buy-out the final year of Burrows' contract in favour of playing a younger player. In March 2016, he was reportedly told by Canucks coaching staff "younger players were a roster priority". However, in the ensuing off-season, the Canucks instead bought-out the contract of teammate Chris Higgins and stated they would not be doing the same to Burrows.

Ottawa Senators (2017–2018)
After Burrows was asked to waive his no-trade clause, on February 27, 2017, he was traded to the Ottawa Senators in exchange for Jonathan Dahlén. Ottawa immediately signed Burrows to a two-year contract extension. He made his debut for the Senators on March 2, 2017, scoring both goals in a 2–1 victory over the Colorado Avalanche. Burrows played 15 games in the 2017 playoffs before suffering an injury in Game 3 of the Eastern Conference finals on May 17, subsequently ending his season. His Ottawa Senators were eliminated in seven games by the eventual Stanley Cup champions Pittsburgh Penguins.

On February 7, 2018, Burrows was suspended ten games for kneeing New Jersey Devils forward Taylor Hall in the head during a game on February 6, 2018. Burrows himself lamented on the incident: "Obviously, I messed up on that one. I let the emotions get the best of me." While serving the suspension, the Senators placed Burrows on waivers, but he went unclaimed by any of the NHL's other 30 teams.

Burrows' first full season in Ottawa was a disappointment, with the forward recording six goals in 71 games. On June 27, 2018, the Senators placed Burrows on unconditional waivers for the purpose of a buyout. Since his contract was signed after he had turned age 35, his salary would still represent a full cap-hit for the team.

Retirement and subsequent coaching (2018–present)
On July 6, 2018, it was announced that Burrows had retired and that he would join the AHL's Laval Rocket as an assistant coach. On December 3, 2019, Burrows was inducted into the Vancouver Canucks Ring of Honour. On February 24, 2021, Burrows was named assistant coach of the NHL's Montreal Canadiens.

Patrick O'Sullivan Incidents
On two separate occasions Burrows told Patrick O'Sullivan "I will hurt you like your father did" once in the minors and once in the NHL. O'Sullivan grew up being verbally and physically abused by his father; Burrows defended his actions stating "I was playing six or seven minutes a night on the fourth line and I wanted to help any way I could. And if I could get one guy off his game and get in someone’s kitchen, I was willing to do it to help our team or maybe get [us] on the power play." Burrows has since apologised and remarked "I see that it was bigger than what I really thought back then"

International play
Following his seventh NHL season, Burrows received his first invite to the Canadian national team for the 2012 IIHF World Championship, held in Finland and Sweden. Burrows' Vancouver Canucks had been eliminated in the first round of the 2012 playoffs, making him available for selection. At 31 years old, he was the oldest player on the Canadian roster. Making his Team Canada debut against Slovakia in the first game of the tournament, he fell to the ice and hit his head after colliding with two opposing players. After leaving the ice, he was kept out of the contest with concerns that he had sustained a concussion. The following day, Burrows' agent, Paul Corbeil, told reporters that while he was symptom free, a return to the line-up would not be possible for four to five days, as per team protocol in scenarios in which a concussion is suspected. Returning to the line-up a week after the hit, he scored his first career international goal against Finnish goaltender Kari Lehtonen in a 5–3 win. The following contest, he scored a shorthanded goal in an 8–0 win against Kazakhstan to earn player of the game honours for Canada.

Ball hockey career
Burrows began playing organized ball hockey at the age of 19. In 2001, he won his first national championship with the Montreal Red Lites in Burnaby, British Columbia. Burrows went on to win the national championship in every year he played with the Red Lites. He was the tournament scoring leader in 2002 and 2003 and earned All-Star Team honours from 2002 to 2004. In 2005, Burrows scored two goals in a 5–2 win against the Toronto Midnight Express in the national final to capture his fifth consecutive Canadian title with the Red Lites. Burrows was named the Tournament MVP by the Canadian Ball Hockey Association (CBHA). He returned the following year to lead the Red Lites to a sixth consecutive title in 2006.

Burrows made his first appearance on the international stage in ball hockey when he was named to Canada's national ball hockey team for the 2003 World Championships in Sierre, Switzerland. He helped Canada beat the Czech Republic 6–1 in the final. Tying for the lead in tournament scoring with five goals and 10 points, Burrows was named the Most Valuable Forward. Two years later, in 2005, he won his second World Championship in as many appearances with Canada in Pittsburgh, Pennsylvania. He capped the season off by being named the 2005 International Player of the Year by the International Street and Ball Hockey Federation (ISBHF). The following year, he was voted in a Canadian poll as the country's greatest ball hockey player ever.

Burrows has credited ball hockey for his fitness and discipline which has carried over to the NHL. Following his first full season with the Canucks in 2006–07, Burrows retired from his ball hockey career. In 2010, he was inducted into the CBHA Hall of Fame, along with national teammate and goaltender Michel Perodeau. He is also a member of the ISBHF Hall of Fame.

Alex Burrows is the president of The Alex Burrows Tour which specializes in large-scale ball hockey tournaments. They are renowned for being accessible to everyone and bringing together the largest number of dek hockey players in one place and offering the most prestigious tournaments across Canada. The Alex Burrows Tour is more than 17 categories (men, women and mixed) with teams from all over North America.

In February of 2020 Alex Burrows launch with is team the LNHB: the very first hockey professional league in the world of ball. The organization, made up of enthusiasts of this sport, works hard to build a clean and solid structure in order to grow ball hockey. All players of the NHLB are paid throughout their career. within the NHLB.

Personal life

Burrows was born in Pincourt, Québec, to parents Rodney and Carole. His father emigrated from London, England, at 23, while his mother, a Québec native, is an elementary school principal. Burrows has two sisters as well—one older and one younger. He grew up speaking mostly French and attended French schools. His English has a noticeable Québecois accent.

In July 2010, Burrows married his longtime girlfriend, Nancy Roy. On April 27, 2011, Nancy gave birth to the couple's first child, a girl named Victoria. Alex became a second-time father on March 4, 2013, to a daughter named Lexie. On November 15, 2015, the couple's third child and first son Jacob was born. They live in Montreal during the offseason.

Burrows was the closest friend on the Canucks to former teammate Luc Bourdon, who died in a motorcycle accident in May 2008. In the hockey season following his death, Burrows occasionally celebrated goals with a bow-and-arrow mime, a gesture that Bourdon himself did after scoring during his junior career. He and his wife (girlfriend at the time) remained close to Bourdon's girlfriend, Charlene Ward.

In the 2009 off-season, Burrows was involved in an assault incident while playing in a summer ice hockey league. Police were called to an arena in Kirkland, Québec, on July 21 after Burrows allegedly struck a goaltender, 19-year-old Koray Celik, in the face. No arrests, however, were made at the scene.

Career statistics

Regular season and playoffs

International

Awards

ECHL

Vancouver Canucks

NHL

Ball hockey

Notes

References

External links

1981 births
Baton Rouge Kingfish players
Canadian ice hockey left wingers
Canadian people of English descent
Canadian people of French descent
Columbia Inferno players
Greenville Grrrowl players
Ice hockey people from Quebec
Living people
Manitoba Moose players
Ottawa Senators players
People from Montérégie
Shawinigan Cataractes players
Ice hockey people from Vancouver
Undrafted National Hockey League players
Vancouver Canucks players
Montreal Canadiens coaches